The Vampire and the Ballerina  is a 1960 Italian horror film  directed and co-written by Renato Polselli.

Cast 
 Hélène Rémy as Luisa
  Walter Brandi as  Herman
  Maria Luisa Rolando as  Countess Alda
  Pier Ugo Gragnani as  Professor 
 Tina Gloriani as  Francesca  
 Isarco Ravaioli as  Luca 
  Gino Turini as  Giorgio

Production
The film's story and screenplay were written by director Renato Polselli and screenplay authors Giuseppe Pellegrini and Ernesto Gastaldi. The original screenplay for the film was written by Giampaolo Callegaris. Ernesto Gastaldi described the script as "rather canine", and wrote a new one with director Renato Polselli. Gastaldi felt the script was no different than any others he had worked on, with the only new element being vampires. Gastaldi commented that since Dracula starring Christopher Lee had been such a big hit in Italy, producers and distributors were eager to make their own vampire films.

Gastaldi recalled the casting for the film involved Gino Turini, who put in part of the money for the film, and Hélène Rémy as the film was originally going to be a co-production deal with France. Gastaldi also noted that the casting of Tina Gloriani was due to her being the director's lover at the time.

The film was shot at the castle of Artena in later 1959 in three weeks. Renato Polselli has claimed that the skeletons in the vampire’s crypt scenes were real skeletons. The shot of the vampire's face deteriorating was a homemade special effect. Polselli stated that the case was made with plaster, followed by the make-up artist molding an adhesive rubber mask over it with a layer of ash between the plastic and rubber. “We made a face cast with plaster, then the make-up artist and I molded an adhesive rubber mask over it. Our trick was to put a layer of ash between the plaster and the rubber."

Release
The Vampire and the Ballerina was released in Italy on May 23, 1960 where it was distributed by Rome International Films. The film grossed a total of 98 million Italian lire on its theatrical run. The film was published as a photonovel in the March 1962 issue of Malia - I fotoromanzi del brivido. The film was shown in Los Angeles on October 31, 1962.

Italian censors gave The Vampire and the Ballerina a V.M. 16 rating, making it "forbidden to those under 16 years old". The censors demanded that all close-ups of the vampire's face be cut and that the final melting of the vampires be shortened. Months after the censors demands were sent, the producer submitted a new version of the film which passed with a V.M. 16 rating and no cuts.

The film has been released for home viewing by Amazon Instant Video and on an English-friendly DVD by NoShame in Italy.

Scream Factory released the film on Blu-ray for the first time in the U.S. on May 22, 2018 with a new high definition transfer of the film sourced from the last surviving film elements.

Legacy
In his book Italian Horror Film Directors, Louis Paul described the film as "an important footnote in the history of Italian horror for being among the first films to blatantly mix sex and horror", and noted it strongly influenced European horror cinema, including late 1960s Hammer productions.

Footnotes

References

See also

List of horror films of 1960
List of Italian films of 1960

External links
 
 Contemporary review in La Stampa

1960 horror films
1960 films
Censorship in Italy
Italian black-and-white films
Gothic horror films
Films shot in Italy
Italian vampire films
Films with screenplays by Ernesto Gastaldi
Films directed by Renato Polselli
1960s Italian-language films
1960s Italian films